George Howell may refer to:

George Evan Howell (1905–1980), U.S. Representative from Illinois
George Howell (cricketer) (1822–1890), Australian cricketer
George Howell (entrepreneur) (born 1945), founder of The Coffee Connection
George Howell (journalist), CNN news anchor
George Howell (Pennsylvania politician) (1859–1913), U.S. Representative from Pennsylvania
George Howell (trade unionist) (1833–1910), British trade unionist and reform campaigner
George Howell (soldier) (1893–1964), Australian Victoria Cross recipient
George Howell Kidder (1925–2009), American lawyer
George Rogers Howell (1833–1899), American historian, genealogist, and science fiction writer